The 2017 New Zealand Music Awards was the 52nd holding of the annual ceremony featuring awards for musical recording artists based in or originating from New Zealand. It took place on 16 November 2017 at Spark Arena in Auckland and it was hosted by Jono Pryor and Ben Boyce. The awards show was broadcast live nationally on Three.

Nominations for the 2017 New Zealand Music Awards opened on 21 June 2017, and cover artists who have had commercial recordings released between 1 August 2016 and 31 July 2017. Nominations closed on 2 August 2017, and the nominees were announced on 5 October.  The artisan award winners will be awarded on  25 October 2017.

Early awards 
While most of the awards will be presented at the main awards ceremony held in November, five genre awards are presented earlier in the year at ceremonies of their field.

 The first was awarded in January, with the Tui for Best Folk Album presented at the Auckland Folk Festival in Kumeu to Kumeu local Guy Wishart for his album West By North.
 In March, the Best Children's Music Album was presented to Anika Moa for her album Songs for Bubbas 2. For 2017, the presentation was moved to March, as part of Children's Day celebrations.
 The Best Country Music Album Tui was presented in June at the New Zealand Country Music Awards in Gore to Jody Direen for her album Shake Up.
 The Tui for Best Pacific Music Album was presented in June at the Vodafone Pacific Music Awards to Aaradhna for her album Brown Girl.
 Also in June, the Tui for Best Jazz Album was presented at the Wellington Jazz Festival to Jonathan Crayford for his recording East West Moon. The award is now part of the Wellington Jazz Festival.

Nominees and winners

A number of changes have been made to the award categories for 2017:

 The Best Male Solo Artist and Best Female Solo Artist have been amalgamated into Best Solo Artist.
 Following the 2016 controversy, the Best Urban/Hip Hop Album has now been split into two awards: Best Hip Hop Artist and Best Soul/RnB Artist.
 The Critic's Choice Award will not be presented in 2017, and the award will be reevaluated.
 The genre awards are now no longer tied to a specific album, in order to reflect the move away from albums in the current recorded music climate. The awards now focus on the artist, with the eligibility changed to "an album OR a minimum of five single tracks".

Winners are listed first and highlighted in boldface.
Key
 – Artisan award

References

External links
Official New Zealand Music Awards website

New Zealand Music Awards, 2017
Music Awards, 2017
Aotearoa Music Awards
November 2017 events in New Zealand